Ionolyce is a small genus of butterflies in the family Lycaenidae. I. helicon is widespread in the Indoaustralasian region (India to the Malay Archipelago. I selkonand I.brunnescens are both endemic to the Solomon Islands.

Species
Ionolyce brunnescens Tite, 1963
Ionolyce helicon (Felder, 1860)
Ionolyce selkon Parsons, 1986

References
"Ionolyce Toxopeus, 1929" at Markku Savela's Lepidoptera and Some Other Life Forms

External links

Images representing Ionolyce  at Bold

Polyommatini
Lycaenidae genera
Taxa named by Lambertus Johannes Toxopeus